Todd George Breman (born 28 October 1965 in Subiaco, Western Australia) is a former cricketer and Australian rules footballer.

Cricket career
Breman debuted for Western Australia during the 1985–1986 season as a medium pace bowler. He played 10 first-class matches and five List A matches over three seasons.

He had played cricket in the summer and football in the winter with the Subiaco Football Club, before pursuing a full-time career in Australian rules football in the Victorian Football League (now AFL).

Football career
After playing with the Subiaco Football Club in the WAFL and leading their goalscoring in 1987 and 1988, Breman was drafted in the 1988 VFL Draft to the West Coast Eagles. Debuting with the club in 1989, he played two seasons in the VFL/AFL before being cut.

After a year out of the AFL he was selected by the Richmond Football Club in 1992 before his AFL career ended after the 1993 season.

Breman was widely regarded as one of the longest kickers of an Australian rules football to have played the game.  In 1991, Kevin Sheedy described him as the best footballer outside of the AFL.

Footnotes

References

1965 births
Living people
Australian cricketers
Australian rules footballers from Western Australia
Cricketers from Perth, Western Australia
Richmond Football Club players
Subiaco Football Club players
West Coast Eagles players
Western Australia cricketers
Western Australian State of Origin players